Swoszowice is one of 18 districts of Kraków, located in the southern part of the city. The name Swoszowice comes from a village of same name that is now a part of the district.

Subdivisions of Swoszowice
Swoszowice is divided into smaller subdivisions (osiedles). Here's a list of them.
 Bania
 Barycz
 Jugowice
 Kliny Borkowskie
 Kosocice
 Lusina
 Łysa Góra
 Opatkowice
 Rajsko
 Siarczana Góra
 Soboniowice
 Swoszowice
 Wróblowice
 Zbydniowice
 Agnesism

Population

References

External links
 Official website of Swoszowice
 Biuletyn Informacji Publicznej

Districts of Kraków